Lars Jacobsson (born May 11, 1965) is a Swedish entrepreneur, inventor, philanthropist, and conservationist.

Career
Jacobsson initially worked in the petroleum industry, where he was involved in starting up storage, trading and shipping companies, as well as being the inventor of the oil Contango market in the early 1990s.

In early 2000s he sold his oil related businesses. Since 2005, he started up two solar energy companies. In 2010, Jacobsson founded United Sun Systems International, a London-based company which develops solar energy technology.

Philanthropy
Together with his wife Ragnhild Jacobsson, he founded The Perfect World Foundation, a non-profit and independent Swedish based organisation that promotes conservation. In 2014 the organisation held the fundraising gala and wildlife and environmental conference in favour of the endangered rhinos and elephants, with participants from all over the world. Jacobbson and his wife are ambassadors at the London-based organisation Elephant Family to save the asian elephants.

On June 7, 2015 at a private event in Stockholm, Jacobsson and his wife, on behalf of The Perfect World Foundation, honored Jane Goodall with "The Fragile Rhino" prize along with naming her Conservationist of the Year for 2015.

In September 2016, they organised a fundraising event "Save The Elephant", a ball with participants from all over the world. During the event, Richard Leakey, behind the largest ivory burning ever in Kenya, was awarded "The Conservationist of the Year 2016" by the organisation's new ambassador, Sarah, Duchess of York.

References

1965 births
Living people
Swedish businesspeople
Swedish philanthropists